Tunah (also Romanized as Tūnah and Tūneh) is a village in Dasht-e Taybad Rural District, Miyan Velayat District, Taybad County, Razavi Khorasan Province, Iran. At the 2006 census, its population was 559, in 103 families.

References 

Populated places in Taybad County